Murch is a surname. Notable people with the surname include: 

Anna Valentina Murch (1949–2014), artist
Arthur Murch (1902–1989), Australian artist
Jamie Murch (born 1975), Australian cricketer
Jordan Murch (born 1989), Scottish football player
Nigel Murch (1944–2020), Australian cricketer
Simmy Murch (1880–1939), baseball player
Thompson H. Murch (1838–1886), politician, stonecutter, editor, publisher and merchant from Maine
Walter Murch (born 1943), Academy Award-winning film editor/sound designer
Walter Tandy Murch (1907–1967), still life painter

See also